The Taybank Hotel is a hotel and restaurant in Dunkeld, Perth and Kinross, Scotland. It is a Category C listed building dating to the early 19th century.

A gazebo in the hotel's garden is also a Category C listed structure.

The building was formerly owned by singer-songwriter Dougie MacLean.

See also
 List of listed buildings in Dunkeld And Dowally, Perth and Kinross

References

External links

Hotels in Perth and Kinross
Listed buildings in Dunkeld
Hotel buildings completed in the 19th century
Listed hotels in Scotland
Category C listed buildings in Perth and Kinross
19th-century establishments in Scotland